Growth differentiation factor-3 (GDF3), also known as Vg-related gene 2 (Vgr-2) is protein that in humans is encoded by the GDF3 gene. GDF3 belongs to the transforming growth factor beta (TGF-β) superfamily. It has high similarity to other TGF-β superfamily members including Vg1 (found in frogs) and GDF1.

Tissue distribution 

Expression of GDF3 occurs in ossifying bone during embryonic development and in the brain, thymus, spleen, bone marrow and adipose tissue of adults.

Function 

GDF3 is a bi-functional protein that has some intrinsic activity and also modulate other TGF-β superfamily members, e.g. potentiates the activity of NODAL. It may also inhibit other TGF-β superfamily members (i.e. BMPs), thus regulating the balance between different modes of TGF-beta signaling. It has been shown to negatively and positively control differentiation of embryonic stem cells in mice and humans. This molecule plays a role in mesoderm and definitive endoderm formation during the pre-gastrulation stages of development.

References

Further reading

Developmental genes and proteins
TGFβ domain